The 2021 Gator Bowl was a college football bowl game played on January 2, 2021, with kickoff at noon EST on ESPN. It was the 76th edition of the Gator Bowl, and was one of the 2020–21 bowl games concluding the 2020 FBS football season. Sponsored by financial technology company TaxSlayer, the game was officially known as the TaxSlayer Gator Bowl. Kentucky would go on to win the Taxslayer Gator Bowl against North Carolina State 23-21. This was Kentucky's third straight bowl victory following the 2019 Citrus Bowl and the 2019 Belk Bowl. The last time the Kentucky football program won three straight bowl games was 2006 to 2008, winning back-to-back Music City Bowls and Liberty Bowl.

Teams
The bowl matchup was announced on December 20, featuring the NC State Wolfpack of the Atlantic Coast Conference (ACC) and the Kentucky Wildcats of the Southeastern Conference (SEC), consistent with the bowl's conference tie-ins. The teams had met twice previously—a win by NC State in 1909 and a win by Kentucky in 1970.

NC State Wolfpack

NC State entered the bowl with an 8–3 record (7–3 in ACC play), ranked 24th in the AP Poll and 23rd in CFP rankings. They also faced five ranked opponents during the season, defeating Pittsburgh and Liberty while falling to Virginia Tech, North Carolina, and Miami (FL). NC State had a 1–3 record in four prior Gator Bowls.

Kentucky Wildcats

Kentucky entered the bowl with a 4–6 record, all in SEC contests. They were one of a limited number of teams to enter a bowl game with a losing record. The Wildcats were ranked 23rd in the AP Poll in late September. They faced five ranked opponents during the season, defeating Tennessee while losing to Auburn, Georgia, Alabama, and Florida. Kentucky had appeared in one prior Gator Bowl, losing the December 2016 edition.

Game summary

1st quarter
Kentucky scored the first points of the bowl game with a twenty-five yard field goal at the 6:00 mark by Kicker Matt Ruffolo after a 9-minute, 68 yard drive. Kentucky had a 3-0 lead at quarter's end.

2nd quarter
Kentucky's lead increased to 10-0 at the 6:23 mark via a four-yard touchdown run by Running Back Chris Rodriguez, Jr. Kentucky would again increase the lead to 13-0 at the end of the half with another field goal by Ruffolo for twenty-six yards.

3rd quarter
At the 2:56 mark, North Carolina State finally scored its first points to make it 13-7 with a nine-yard touchdown pass to Receiver C.J. Riley from Quarterback Bailey Hockman.

4th quarter
Kentucky increased its lead with Ruffolo's third field goal of the game for twenty-yards to make it 16-7 at the 5:45 mark. However, at the 4:46 mark NC State responded with a thirteen-yard touchdown run by Running Back Zonovan Knight to make it 16-14. Kentucky increased its lead again with Running Back Rodriguez, Jr.s' second rushing touchdown of the game for twenty-six yards, making the score 23-14 at the 2:55 mark. At the 1:10 mark, NC State responded again with a two-yard touchdown run by Running Back Jordan Houston to make the score 23-21. Since NC State had used its final timeout at the 1:01 mark, Kentucky was able to run out the clock to seal the victory, winning 23-21. Kentucky Running Back Asim Rose, Jr. was named the Gator Bowl MVP after rushing for 148 yards on only twelve carries, accounting for well more than half of Kentucky's 288 total rushing yards.

Scoring summary

Statistics

References

External links

Game statistics at statbroadcast.com

Gator Bowl
Gator Bowl
Gator Bowl
Gator Bowl
NC State Wolfpack football bowl games
Kentucky Wildcats football bowl games